The 2018 Russian Cup Final decided the winner of the 2017–18 Russian Cup, the 26th season of Russia's main football cup. It was played on 9 May 2018 at the Volgograd Arena, between Tosno and Avangard Kursk. Tosno won the game courtesy of goals from Aleksei Skvortsov and Reziuan Mirzov, with Igor Kireyev scoring a consolation goal for the second division side.

As winners, Tosno qualified for the group stage of the UEFA Europa League and were also set to face the champions of the Russian Premier League, Lokomotiv Moscow in the 2018 Russian Super Cup held on 27 July. However, on 9 June 2018, it was announced that FC Tosno was dissolved because of financial problems and CSKA Moscow replaced them as participants in the Super Cup.

Background
This was the first Russian Cup final appearance for either side.

With Tosno having only been formed in 2013, they came into the game, in their first season in the Russian Premier League, in the relegation zone.

Avangard Kursk, midtable in the second division, would also have claimed their first-ever piece of silverware and have never before played in the Russian top flight.

Match details
The final match was played on 9 May 2018.

References

Russian Cup finals
Russian Cup
Cup